World's Finest Comics was an American comic book series published by DC Comics from 1941 to 1986. The series was initially titled World's Best Comics for its first issue; issue #2 (Summer 1941) switched to the more familiar name. Michael E. Uslan has speculated that this was because DC received a cease and desist letter from Better Publications, Inc., who had been publishing a comic book entitled Best Comics since November 1939. Virtually every issue featured DC's two leading superheroes, Superman and Batman, with the earliest issues also featuring Batman's sidekick, Robin.

Publication history
The idea for World's Best Comics #1 originated from the identically formatted 1940 New York World's Fair Comics featuring Superman, Batman, and Robin with 96 pages and a cardboard cover. The year before there was a similar 1939 New York World's Fair Comics featuring Superman but without Batman and Robin because Bill Finger and Bob Kane had not yet created them.

The series was initially a 96-page quarterly anthology, featuring various DC characters – always including Superman and Batman – in separate stories. Comics historian Les Daniels noted that "pairing Superman and Batman made sense financially, since the two were DC's most popular heroes". When superheroes fell out of vogue in the early 1950s, DC shortened the size of the publication to that of the rest of its output, leaving only enough space for one story; this led to Superman and Batman appearing in the same story together starting with World's Finest Comics #71 (July 1954). The title often depicted Batman gaining superpowers as a way to avoid having him be overshadowed by Superman. Lex Luthor and the Joker first joined forces in issue #88 (June 1957). A new supervillain, the Composite Superman, was introduced in #142 (June 1964). The story "The Clash of Cape and Cowl", by writer Edmond Hamilton and artist Curt Swan, in World's Finest Comics #153 (Nov. 1965) is the source of an Internet meme in which Batman slaps Robin. Noted Batman artist Neal Adams first drew the character in an interior story in "The Superman-Batman Revenge Squads" in issue #175 (May 1968).

The title briefly featured Superman teaming with heroes other than Batman in the early 1970s beginning with issue #198 (November 1970). That issue featured the first part of a two-issue team-up with the Flash. Other characters to appear in the next two years included Robin, Green Lantern, Aquaman, Wonder Woman, the Teen Titans, Doctor Fate, Hawkman, Green Arrow, the Martian Manhunter, the Atom, and the Vigilante. Nick Cardy was the cover artist for World's Finest Comics for issues #212–228. Metamorpho was the backup feature in issues #218–220 and #229 after the character had a brief run as the backup in Action Comics.

The series reverted to Superman and Batman team-ups after issue #214, initially with a unique twist, featuring the children they might one day have: Superman Jr. and Batman Jr. These characters, billed as the Super-Sons, were co-created by writer Bob Haney and artist Dick Dillin in issue #215 (January 1973). Super-Sons stories alternated with tales of the original Superman and Batman through issue #263, with issues #215–216, 221–222, 224, 228, 230, 231, 233, 238, 242, and 263 featuring the sons. Haney frequently disregarded continuity by scripting stories which contradicted DC's canon or by writing major heroes in an out-of-character fashion. He introduced Batman's older brother, Thomas Wayne Jr., in World's Finest Comics #223 (May–June 1974). This story was used as a basis for a plot detail in the "Court of Owls" story arc in 2012. Issues #223 (May–June 1974) to #228 (March–April 1975) of the series were in the 100 Page Super Spectacular format.

With issue #244 (April–May 1977), World's Finest Comics became one of the first 80-page Dollar Comics. It featured the Superman and Batman team with back-up features. The number of pages was reduced from 80 to 64 starting with issue #252 (August–September 1978) and reduced to 48 pages with issue #266 (December 1980 – January 1981) which lasted until issue #282 (August 1982).

Issue #250 (April–May 1978) combined Superman and Batman with the Green Arrow, the Black Canary, and Wonder Woman into the World's Finest Team in a 56-page story. Writer Roy Thomas wrote a book-length story for issue #271 (September 1981) which pieced together all the "first meetings" of Superman and Batman. This issue did not have any backup features. The Hawkman story "Drive Me to the Moon!" in #272 (October 1981) featured Hawkgirl changing her title to Hawkwoman. As of issue #283 (September 1982), the series reverted to a standard format title again featuring only Superman and Batman team-ups, which continued until the series' cancellation with issue #323 (January 1986). The series reached issue #300 in February 1984. This double-sized anniversary issue was a "jam" featuring a story by writers David Anthony Kraft, Mike W. Barr, and Marv Wolfman with art by Ross Andru, Mark Texeira, Sal Amendola, and George Pérez. David Mazzucchelli, the artist of the "Batman: Year One" story arc in 1987, first drew Batman in a backup story in World's Finest Comics #302 (April 1984). Issue #314 (April 1985) was the last Pre-Crisis issue and the first Crisis on Infinite Earths appearances of the Monitor and (Lyla) the Harbinger. The series ended with issue #323 (January 1986) by writer Joey Cavalieri and artist José Delbo.

Titles
A number of World's Finest titles have since appeared:	
 A three-issue miniseries in 1990 by Dave Gibbons, Steve Rude and Karl Kesel. In the series, Superman and Batman battle their archenemies Lex Luthor and the Joker, and for that, they temporary exchange their places in their home cities, thus, Superman goes to Gotham City, and Batman goes to Metropolis.
 A three-issue Legends of the World's Finest miniseries in 1994 by Walt Simonson and Dan Brereton.	
 A two-issue Superboy/Robin: World's Finest Three miniseries in 1996.	
Elseworld's Finest – a two-issue miniseries that reimagines Superman and Batman in a 1920s style pulp adventure.	
 World's Finest: Parts I-III (also known as The Batman/Superman Movie) and Batman/Superman Adventures: World's Finest, a 1997 three-part episode of Superman: The Animated Series and its comics adaptation, respectively.	
 Elseworld's Finest: Supergirl & Batgirl, a one-shot in 1998.
 Superman and Batman: World's Funnest, featuring Mr. Mxyzptlk and Bat-Mite.	
 A 10-issue miniseries in 1999 written by Karl Kesel and illustrated by Dave Taylor. This series explored the Post-Crisis history of the two with each of the 10 issues taking place one year after the other.
 William Morrow and Company released a World's Finest novel in 2009, titled Enemies and Allies by novelist Kevin J. Anderson. The story is about the first meeting between the Dark Knight and the Man of Steel during the Cold War.
 A four-issue World's Finest miniseries written by Sterling Gates was published in late 2009 and early 2010. In the series, Superman has relocated to New Krypton and Batman (Bruce Wayne) is presumed dead. Thus, it falls to various members of the Superman and Batman families to battle a threat posed by the Toyboy, Mr. Freeze, the Penguin and the Kryptonite Man. Protagonists include Superman Family members Nightwing (Chris Kent), the Guardian and Supergirl, along with Batman Family members the Red Robin (Tim Drake), Robin (Damian Wayne), the Oracle and Batgirl (Stephanie Brown). Superman and Batman (Dick Grayson) appear in the final issue.
 While not released under the name World's Finest, the series Superman/Batman fulfilled much the same function as its predecessor. It was published from 2003 to 2011.
 A new monthly team-up series titled Batman/Superman was launched in 2013.
 A new ongoing series with a similar name but a differently-placed apostrophe, Worlds' Finest, began in May 2012. It starred Power Girl and the Huntress. In this incarnation, the two are natives of Earth-2, where they used the codenames Supergirl and Robin, respectively. With issue #29 the series began to feature the Superman and Batman of Earth 2 as the main characters.
 Batwoman: World's Finest – in October 2012, the Batwoman title's third storyline featured Batwoman fighting alongside Wonder Woman in a five-issue story arc.
 Batgirl: World's Finest - in March 2017, the first Annual of Batgirl (vol. 5) saw Batgirl team with Supergirl for a special mission.
 Batman/Superman: World's Finest – In December 2021, it was announced that a new ongoing series would begin publication in March 2022, with Mark Waid writing and Dan Mora serving as illustrator.

Collected editions

In other media
 "World's Finest" is the 16th, 17th and 18th episodes of the second season of Superman: The Animated Series, and the 29th, 30th and 31st of the overall series. Originally, this three-parter aired back-to-back as a movie event on October 4, 1997. The episode depicts the first meeting of Batman and Superman in the DCAU, when Batman comes to Metropolis in pursuit of the Joker, who has offered to kill Superman for Lex Luthor. Superman finds himself out of his depth when matched against the Joker's cunning and unpredictability, while Batman has trouble with the resources Luthor provides the Joker with. Both heroes must agree to overcome their differences in order to put a stop to the Joker and Luthor. In 2002, The Batman Superman Movie was released on DVD. This was the three episodes from the "World's Finest" story arc of Season 2 of Superman: The Animated Series (1997) combined into a feature-length film.
 In 2004, a fan trailer for a World's Finest movie was released.
 In the 2009 direct-to-video animated film Superman/Batman: Public Enemies (an adaptation of "The World's Finest", the opening story arc of Superman/Batman), the Man of Steel and the Dark Knight team up to prevent a meteoroid from striking Earth and to take down Lex Luthor, who has been elected President of the United States and has framed Superman for murder. DCAU cast members Kevin Conroy, Tim Daly, Clancy Brown and C. C. H. Pounder reprised their respective roles as Batman, Superman, Luthor and Amanda Waller. Additionally, Allison Mack (Chloe Sullivan from the television series Smallville) voiced the role of Power Girl.
 In 2010, a sequel was released titled Superman/Batman: Apocalypse which is an adaptation of Jeph Loeb and Michael Turner's second story arc, "The Supergirl from Krypton". DCAU cast members Kevin Conroy, Tim Daly, Susan Eisenberg, and Edward Asner reprised their respective roles as Batman, Superman, Wonder Woman and Granny Goodness.  Additionally, Summer Glau voiced the role of Supergirl and Andre Braugher portrayed Darkseid.
 The eighteenth episode of the first season of Supergirl is titled "Worlds Finest". The episode is a crossover with The Flash and features a team-up of the title characters of both series. Kara Danvers gains a new ally when the lightning-fast superhero The Flash suddenly appears from an alternate universe and helps Kara battle Siobhan, aka Silver Banshee, and Livewire in exchange for her help in finding a way to return him home.

See also 
 Superman/Batman
 Superman & Batman: Generations

References

External links
World's Finest Online official website

World's Finest Comics at Mike's Amazing World of Comics
Batman and Superman: World's Finest at Mike's Amazing World of Comics

1941 comics debuts
1986 comics endings
Comics magazines published in the United States
Comics by Bob Haney
Comics by Dennis O'Neil
Comics by Gardner Fox
Comics by Gerry Conway
Comics by Len Wein
Comics by Marv Wolfman
Comics by Neal Adams
Comics by Paul Kupperberg
Comics by Roy Thomas
Golden Age comics titles
Magazines established in 1941
Magazines disestablished in 1986
Team-up comics